W.H. Bramble Airport, also known as Blackburne Airport, was an international airport on the east coast of the island of Montserrat, a British Overseas Territory in the Caribbean. It was named after Montserrat Chief Minister William Henry Bramble.

The airport was destroyed in 1997 by an eruption of the nearby Soufrière Hills volcano, which obliterated much of the southern part of the island. For several years after the disaster, Montserrat was only accessible by helicopter or boat, until July 2005, when the new Gerald's Airport (now John A. Osborne Airport) was completed at the north end of the island (north of Saint Johns and south of Gerald's). The IATA airport code previously used by Bramble Airport, MNI, has now been transferred to the new airport.

W. H. Bramble Airport was served by the following airlines:
 LIAT
 Winair
 Montserrat Airways
 Carib Aviation
 occasionally American Eagle Airlines

See also
 Air Montserrat

External links
 North from Bramble Airport, added 13 June 2006, YouTube.com
 Caribbean Airports

Airports in Montserrat
Defunct airports in the Caribbean
1997 disestablishments in Montserrat